Daniell is a lunar impact crater located in the southern half of the Lacus Somniorum. To the south-southeast is the much larger crater Posidonius. The Rimae Daniell rille system are to the west of Daniell crater.

The rim of Daniell is oval in form, with the long axis oriented north-northwest to south-southeast. Most of the wall is well-formed and relatively free of wear, although it appears slumped at the southern end. The interior is relatively featureless, and lacks a central peak. The floor surface has a lower albedo than the surroundings and has some cleft-like features.

Satellite craters
By convention these features are identified on lunar maps by placing the letter on the side of the crater midpoint that is closest to Daniell.

References
 

 
 
 
 
 
 
 
 
 
 
 
 

Impact craters on the Moon